Tantrum of the Muse was a heavy metal band based out of Lancaster County, Pennsylvania. The band formed in 1998 and disbanded in 2004. The band members refers to their existence as "The Tantrum Reign of Terror".

History

Origin and The Heart is a Two Headed Sperm (1998-2000)

Beginning in 1998, when founding member Stephen Mark Sarro (guitar, vocals) and long time music mate, Udrick Wise (drums) decided to turn their studio project into an actual live band. They recruited their hometown friend, Jason Stauffer (bass) to play with them and put together a couple songs and began playing shows.

The band soon went into the studio to record a new batch of songs, Jason Stauffer was kicked out and replaced by Jim Settle. Stephen and Udrick, recorded the songs that became the band's debut album. Entitled The Heart is a Two Headed Sperm. The album, which was originally slated for release on Philadelphia's punk label, "Sofa Records", but Sofa decided not to release the record and the band made copies and sold them DIY at their shows. The band was offered a record deal with Seattle's Tooth & Nail records, but passed.

In 1999, the band played Cornerstone Music Festival, where their reputation for originality caught the attention of Takehold Records, who signed the band and officially re-released The Heart is a Two Headed Sperm. The show where Tantrum gathered Takehold's interest, the members regard as one of their worst sets, as during the set Settle passed out and both Wise and Sarro suffered from heat exhaustion.

Modernmu$ick(2000) (2000-2001)
In 2000, the band entered the studio to record Modernmu$ick(2000)!, their follow-up album which was released July 2000. The band spent three months on the road, touring with Underoath, Narcissus, and Few Left Standing. Much like their debut, Modernmu$ick(2000)! was shown to have a unique, heartfelt musical chemistry. The album was a groundbreaking and original sound, using fretless bass, detuned guitar work, freak-out style drum work, that blended elements of hardcore punk, metal, prog-rock, and electronic music to overwhelming effects. The response to the album and its content was met with critical praise and controversy. During the band's stint with Takehold Records, Jim was dealing with major issues at home. The band continued to play for the rest of the year, with Jim struggling to keep up the momentum.

In 2001, the band agreed to release a live album with Ohio-based Burning Records. Burning released The Downtrodden & the Sidhe. The band went on a temporary hiatus. Settle moved to Florida. Wild quit the band to join The Huntingtons. Sarro continued to look for a drummer.

Final releases and Break-up (2002-2004)
In 2002, the band worked out their issues with Settle. The band agreed to play once that year together at the Chameleon club in Lancaster PA, with Today is the Day. After that show, Stephen moved to FL with Jim to work on piecing Tantrum of the Muse back together. While staying in FL, Stephen recorded a solo improvisational album called "Sympathy for the Living". While in FL, Takehold records alerted the band that the label had been merged with Tooth & Nail Records, and the label would no longer operate. The band had a 2nd option to sign to T&N, but this time agreed that the state the band was in, would make it impossible to fill the new duties of signing to such a big label. Stephen and Jim declined to merge on. Devastated by the turn of events, the band again went on a hiatus. Shortly after recording, Stephen moved back to PA.

In 2003, Stephen decided that the band was going to continue with all new members and began auditions. Udrick, who was still in the Huntingtons, agreed to come back to Tantrum of the Muse. With the musical direction the band was about to take, they asked a friend, Seth Luzier to join as a keyboard player. Through Seth, they met bassist Tyler Lambert, and asked him to join. The new line up began playing again. Shortly after, Jim Settle moved to PA. Naturally, the band decided to ask Jim to return, and try to continue what they started in 1998. Stephen, Jim, Udrick, and newly recruited Seth began to re-record older songs with new keyboard arrangements.

In 2004, Seth's wife left him, resulting in more stress and conflict. Udrick, deciding to again move on. The band played once more at the annual "Screaming at the Sky" hardcore music festival. Shortly after, Stephen decided to officially end Tantrum of the Muse, and went to HM Magazine for an official statement. HM magazine shared the details in a lengthy interview. In more recent days, band members have gone on to form other bands. Stephen recorded "A Human Comedy" with a new band called Unteachers, and Jim Settle is currently frontman for Hand of Fire.

Members
Final Line-up

Former 
 Tyler Lambert - Bass (2003-2004)
 Jason Shauffer - Bass (1998)

Session
 Trav Turner - Drums (ex-Crutch, Solamors, ex-UnTeachers) (2000)

Timeline

Discography
Studio albums
 The Heart is a Two Headed Sperm (Takehold Records - 1999)
 Modernmu$ick(2000)! (Takehold Records - 2000)
Other releases
 The Downtrodden & the Sidhe (Burning Records - 2001)
 Heart Surgery (2003 Sessions) (Independent - 2003)

References

American art rock groups
Heavy metal musical groups from Pennsylvania
American Christian metal musical groups
Tooth & Nail Records artists